Mayi-Kutuna, also spelt Mayaguduna, Maikudunu and other variants, is an extinct Mayabic language once spoken by the Mayi-Kutuna, an Aboriginal Australian people of the present-day Cape York Peninsula in northern Queensland, Australia.

Gavan Breen (1981) thought that the Marrago might have been a sub-group of the Mayi Kutuna people; Paul Memmott (1994) lists the Marrago language separately but gives no further detail. Their status is unconfirmed by the AIATSIS collection.

References 

Mayabic languages
Extinct languages of Queensland